Luch (ray, beam) is a watch brand produced by the OJSC Minsk Watch Plant, the only watch plant in Belarus. The decision to build the plant was taken in 1953, and from 1955 watches were produced in Minsk, including the brands Luch, Zarya and Vympel.  Since 2010 the Minsk Watch Plant is owned by the Swiss company Franck Muller.

Watch production 

The plant has kept the full cycle of watch production.

Collections 
Luch has produced the following collections:
 "One hand watch" — watch with only one hand;
 "Retro" — models of the 1960s in modern interpretation;
 "Ceramic" — ceramic metal watch, made of hypoallergenic materials;
 "Ego" — mechanical watch, with a case made of steel, with a sapphire crystal and transparent back cover;
 "Volat" — watch with chronograph, water resistant, sapphire crystal, made of stainless steel;
 "Tweed" — watch with an alarm clock, on tweed straps.

Brand chain of stores Luch 
As of 2018 in Belarus there are 14 brand stores of Luch, seven of which are located in Minsk.

Non-core production 
The OJSC Minsk Watch Plant also produces equipment for technical industrial purposes.

Certificates 
A number of certificates were received for the products of the OJSC Minsk Watch Plant:

References

External links 
 
 Watch-Wiki on Luch
 Russian Ultra-Thin 2209 Movement page which includes Luch watches

Watch manufacturing companies of the Soviet Union
Manufacturing companies of Belarus
Manufacturing companies established in 1953
Companies based in Minsk
Belarusian brands
Soviet watch brands
1953 establishments in Belarus
Watch movement manufacturers